Hotel Champlain is a historic hotel building located in Plattsburgh, New York.  It served as William McKinley's "Summer White House". It is now the site of Clinton Community College.

History
The hotel was opened on June 17, 1890.  The first hotel building, designed by New York architect George E. Harney, was badly damaged by fire in 1910.  A new building was constructed and used from 1911 until it was closed in 1951 and converted into a college.

See also
 List of residences of presidents of the United States

Sources

Hotels in New York (state)
Clinton County, New York